Miyu Yakata (born 30 December 1999) is a Japanese professional footballer who plays as a forward for WE League club MyNavi Sendai Ladies.

Club career 
Yakata made her WE League debut on 12 September 2021.

References

External links 

WE League players
Association football people from Kyoto Prefecture
Living people
1999 births
Japanese women's footballers
Women's association football forwards
Mynavi Vegalta Sendai Ladies players